Madonna with the Green Cushion (French: La Vierge au coussin vert) is an oil painting by the Italian artist Andrea Solari, painted in  1507–1510, and it is now owned by the Louvre Museum in Paris.

The Leonardesque type of the Madonna proves that Solari after his return from Venice, became strongly influenced by Leonardo da Vinci. The colouring and lush effects of this painting also shows Leonardo's influence, but his own artistic temperament is also present. 
It is considered to be one of his best known works.

References

Sources
   

1510 paintings
Paintings in the Louvre by Italian artists
Paintings of the Madonna and Child
Breastfeeding in art
Allegorical paintings by Italian artists
16th-century allegorical paintings